Diwan Bahadur Kanchi Krishnaswamy Rao  (1845–1923) was an Indian civil servant, judge and administrator who served as the Diwan of Travancore from 1898 to 1904.

Early life and education 

Krishnaswamy Rao was born into Deshastha Madhva Brahmin family Salem in September 1845. His father Kanchi Venkata Rao was a Huzur Sheristadar at the District Collectorate. He had his schooling and on completion of his matriculation at the age of sixteen, he entered government service.

Career 
Krishnaswamy Rao began his career in October 1864 as a record-keeper in the Nellore district court at a salary of Rs. 20. In 1867, he was promoted as Sheristadar in view of his superior abilities and became a District Munsiff in July 1870. In 1883, he was appointed sub-judge at Cocanada. In May 1894, he was made Chief Justice of Travancore by the then Maharaja and served from 1884 till his appointment as Diwan in 1898.

He was appointed a Companion of the Order of the Indian Empire (CIE) in November 1901.

Death 
Krishnaswamy Rao died in 1923.

Notes 

Indian civil servants
1845 births
1923 deaths
Companions of the Order of the Indian Empire
Diwans of Travancore
Dewan Bahadurs
Madhva Brahmins